The Cluny is a 300-capacity live music venue, pub and café, on Lime Street, in the Ouseburn Valley area of Newcastle upon Tyne, England. Based in a former flax spinning mill, The Cluny occupies part of the wider building at 36 Lime Street, sharing the space with artists, offices and recording studios.
The Cluny is a regular fixture in the top 100 list of World's Best Bars.

History
The building of 36 Lime Street was completed in 1848, when it was opened as a flax spinning mill. The building was commissioned by Messrs Plummer & Cooke and designed by John Dobson. Lasting just 12 years, it was re-opened in 1860 as a steam-powered flour mill by Henry Proctor & Co.
At some point in its history, the building became a Scotch whisky bottling plant called the Cluny, hence the current name.
In 1982, Bruvvers Theatre Company purchased the building and it became an artists’ space.
A section of the building was opened as The Cluny Bar in 1999, and the same space was taken over by The Head Of Steam Limited in November 2002, when its current incarnation came about.
The Cluny now operates as a bar and live music venue, with food service provided by The Cluny Kitchen, and 36 Lime Street itself is a Grade 2 listed building.

Location
The Cluny is located in Newcastle upon Tyne's Ouseburn Valley, an area of intense regeneration in recent years. Whilst the area was the cradle of the Industrial Revolution in Newcastle and was once home to many thriving (and very dirty) heavy crafts and industries, it fell into disuse and dereliction by the mid-twentieth century. The current incarnation of the Valley as a cultural regeneration hotspot was initiated by the Ouseburn Trust, in partnership with the local authority, in 1996. The Trust remains a landlord and developer in the Ouseburn, and seeks to involve people in the heritage and regeneration of the area through its programme of free walks, talks and volunteering activities.

The regeneration of the Ouseburn Valley has seen several artistic and cultural enterprises move into the area. These include children's literature centre Seven Stories,  Ouseburn Farm, Stepney Bank Stables, The Star & Shadow Cinema, Northern Print and art galleries; The Biscuit Factory,  Mushroom Works and Art Works.
These complement the already-established pub-trade which has long served the area, including The Free Trade, The Tyne, The Cumberland Arms, The Ship Inn and The Tanners.
The valley is named after the Ouseburn river, which flows into the River Tyne, and is just yards from the door of The Cluny itself.

Bar
The Cluny's bar is renowned for its huge selection of real ales and world lagers, and strives to use local and independent breweries wherever possible.
The Cluny was one of only two pubs in Newcastle to make it into the 2004 Good Pub Guide.

Venue
The Cluny has a live music venue that has been described as "one of the most important venues for breaking bands in the region". Notable acts to have played the venue in recent years include The Vapors, The Vaccines, Glasvegas, The Futureheads, Mumford & Sons, I Am Kloot, Editors, We Are Scientists, Daniel Johnston, Arctic Monkeys, Kate Nash, Graham Coxon, Seasick Steve, Mercury Prize nominees Led Bib, The Go! Team and Paul Heaton.

From 1999 to 2003, Keith Morris and Charlie McGovern ran the influential weekly Schmazz jazz club at The Cluny, bringing radical performers like Gilad Atzmon and Reem Kelani to the city.

In 2002, Dannii Minogue played the venue in support of her single "Put The Needle On It".

On 20 January 2007, Maxïmo Park previewed their second album, Our Earthly Pleasures in its entirety at The Cluny.

In January 2008, as part of The JD Set, Peter Hook collaborated with The Wombats on a one-off live performance of their single Backfire at the Disco. A live recording of the song was released in April 2008, as a b-side on the single's re-release.

In February 2008, Duffy played at The Cluny, the gig coinciding with the Welsh singer's second week at number one with her single Mercy.
In November 2008, Solange Knowles, younger sister of Beyoncé Knowles, played at The Cluny as part of her first UK tour.

The Cluny is also one of the venues to be used for the filming of The JD Set, broadcast on Channel 4, and is also one of the key venues for the indoor programme of the Evolution Festival, UK.

In September 2010, The Cluny played host to a series of concerts, on three consecutive nights, by the legendary New York Dolls. In January, 2017, Tyketto performed there.

Best Live Music Venue award
The Cluny was voted Best Live Music Venue by music development agency Generator North East in May 2009.

Cluny 2
In May 2009, it was announced that The Cluny would be taking over the running of the adjacent former Round Theatre, which went into liquidation in 2008. Re-branded as Cluny 2, it is a theatre-style, 180-capacity venue. The opening event occurred on Monday 11 May, and featured performances from Beth Jeans Houghton and Dot To Dots.
Since then, Cluny 2 has seen performances by The Low Anthem, Elliott Brood, Woodpigeon, Dent May, Alvin Youngblood Hart, Sharks Took the Rest and The Duke & The King, the new project featuring Simon Felice, formerly of The Felice Brothers.

See also
Ouseburn
Ouseburn Valley

References

External links 
The Cluny website
Jumpin Hot Club

Music venues in Tyne and Wear
Culture in Newcastle upon Tyne
Buildings and structures in Newcastle upon Tyne
Tourist attractions in Newcastle upon Tyne
Flax
Textile mills in England